The 2019 American Athletic Conference baseball tournament was held at Spectrum Field in Clearwater, Florida, from May 21 through 26. The event, held at the end of the conference regular season, determined the champion of the American Athletic Conference for the 2019 season.  The winner of the double-elimination tournament, Cincinnati, will receive the conference's automatic bid to the 2019 NCAA Division I baseball tournament.

Format and seeding
The top eight baseball teams in The American were seeded based on their records in conference play.  The tournament used a two bracket double-elimination format, leading to a single championship game between the winners of each bracket.

Bracket

Conference championship

References

Tournament
American Athletic Conference Baseball Tournament
Baseball competitions in Florida
American Athletic Conference baseball tournament
American Athletic Conference baseball tournament
College sports tournaments in Florida